Irafshan (also Romanized as Īrafshān; also known as Eskandar, Qal‘eyh-ye Īrafshān, Sekandar, and Sīkandar) is a village in Irafshan Rural District, Ashar District, Mehrestan County, Sistan and Baluchestan Province, Iran. At the 2006 census, its population was 602, in 106 families.

References 

Populated places in Mehrestan County